"Walk It Talk It" is a 2018 song by Migos featuring Drake.

Walk It Talk It may also refer to:
"Walk It Talk It", a song by Lou Reed from American Poet (1972)
"Walk It Talk It", a song by Yung Wun (2004)